Isaac Asimov Presents The Great SF Stories 17 (1955) is the seventeenth volume of Isaac Asimov Presents The Great SF Stories, which is a series of short story collections, edited by Isaac Asimov and Martin H. Greenberg, which attempts to list the great science fiction stories from the Golden Age of Science Fiction. They date the Golden Age as beginning in 1939 and lasting until 1963. This volume was originally published by DAW books in January 1988.

Contents 
 "The Tunnel Under the World" by Frederik Pohl
 "The Darfsteller" by Walter M. Miller, Jr.
 "The Cave of Night" by James E. Gunn
 "Grandpa" by James H. Schmitz
 "Who?" by Theodore Sturgeon
 "The Short Ones" by Raymond E. Banks
 "Captive Market" by Philip K. Dick
 "Allamagoosa" by Eric Frank Russell
 "The Vanishing American" by Charles Beaumont
 "The Game of Rat and Dragon" by Cordwainer Smith
 "The Star" by Arthur C. Clarke
 "Nobody Bothers Gus" by Algis Budrys
 "Delenda Est" by Poul Anderson
 "Dreaming Is a Private Thing" by Isaac Asimov

Notes

17
1988 anthologies
DAW Books books
Martin H. Greenberg anthologies